The La Musique des Voltigeurs de Québec is the regimental band of the Les Voltigeurs de Québec.  it was led by Captain François Dorion, a professional saxophonist and percussionist and a member of the regiment since 1991.

It was created on February 14, 1866, as the first francophone military band, and quickly gained a reputation among authorities and the general public. The band was instrumental in the first performance of "O Canada" in 1880 at the National Congress of the St. John the Baptist Society. It went through many reorganizations during both world wars that shaped the band into its current form.

Traditional and modern activities

The Voltigeurs musical schedule includes several activities:

 Military parades
 Regimental dinners
 Concerts
 Regimental holidays
 State dinners
 Presentation of Colours
 Graduation parades

The musicians of the band are, for the most part, professionals trained at the Conservatoire de Québec and the Faculty of Music at Laval University. It has recorded and released many albums, with the most recent one being launched in 2008 to commemorate the 400th anniversary of Quebec City. The band participated in a number of editions of the Quebec City International Festival of Military Bands until the tattoo's final event in 2013. In 2018, the band participated in the reopening of the Quebec City Armoury by Prime Minister Justin Trudeau.

Following the example of the Queen's Own Rifles of Canada Band & Bugles, the band also has a drum and bugle corps, being one of the few in the Canadian Armed Forces (CAF) in active service.

See also
 Les Voltigeurs de Québec
 La Musique du Royal 22e Régiment
 Canadian military bands
 Military band

References

Les Voltigeurs de Québec
Bands of the Canadian Army
Musical groups from Quebec City
Musical groups established in 1866
1866 establishments in Canada